Yegishe Melikyan (born on 13 August 1979 in Yerevan) is a retired Armenian football defender and manager.

Career

International
Melikyan was a member of the Armenia national team, participated in 29 international matches since his debut in away Euro 2004 qualifying match against Greece on 16 October 2002.

Coaching
On 28 June, Melikyan was appointed as manager of Alashkert.
On 7 January 2021, Melikyan was appointed as manager of FC Pyunik.

National team statistics

Achievements

Player
Araks Ararat
 Armenian Cup: 1999
 Armenian Premier League: 2000

Banants
 Armenian Cup: 2007

Manager
Pyunik
 Armenian Premier League: 2021–22

Individual
 Armenian Premier League Manager of the Season: 2021–22

References

External links
 

1979 births
Living people
Footballers from Yerevan
Armenian footballers
Armenia international footballers
Armenian expatriate footballers
FC Urartu players
FC Metalurh Donetsk players
FC Zorya Luhansk players
FC Stal Alchevsk players
FC Hoverla Uzhhorod players
Armenian Premier League players
Ukrainian Premier League players
Ulisses FC players
Expatriate footballers in Ukraine
Association football defenders
Armenian football managers
Armenian expatriate football managers
Expatriate football managers in Ukraine
FC Stal Kamianske managers
Armenian expatriate sportspeople in Ukraine
FC Lviv managers
FC Alashkert managers